Anne Cirkel is an electronic design automation industry executive, who is currently Senior Director for Technology Marketing at Mentor, a Siemens Business.

Annie Cirkel was born in Eschweiler, Germany and earned degrees in metallurgy, economics and business administration from Aachen University. Her EDA career started with a position at Viewlogic  in their field office in Munich, Germany (Viewlogic was acquired by Synopsys in 1997.) In 1999, she moved to Portland, Oregon, to work for Analogy (now part of Synopsys) and the same year she was offered a job at Mentor's Wilsonville, Oregon headquarters.

Awards
2018: Marie Pistilli Award
IEEE EDA Outstanding Service Award

References

Year of birth missing (living people)
Living people
American women business executives
American technology executives
Electronic design automation people
RWTH Aachen University alumni
Electronic engineering award winners
21st-century American women